Territorial Defense or Territorial Defense Forces may refer to:

Active

 Territorial Troops Militia, a Cuban paramilitary militia under the command of the MINFAR
 Territorial Forces (Finland)
 Territorial Troops (Kazakhstan)
 Territorial Defence Force (Poland), an active military reserve component of the Polish armed forces
 Territorial Defense Forces (Ukraine)
 Territorial Defense Student, Thailand

Defunct

 Territorial Defense Forces (Poland), an armed force responsible for the internal security of Poland separate from the Polish Army from 1965 until 2008
 Territorial Defense (Yugoslavia), an independent formation of the People's Army of the former Socialist Federal Republic of Yugoslavia
 Territorial Defence Force of the Republic of Bosnia and Herzegovina
 Slovenian Territorial Defence
 Territorial defence battalions (Ukraine)

See also
 Military reserve force
 Territorial Army (disambiguation)